Headline Hunters may refer to:

 Headline Hunters (game show), a Canadian game show
 Headline Hunters (1945 film), a Canadian documentary film
 Headline Hunters (1955 film), an American crime film
 Headline Hunters (1968 film), a British drama film